The Philippines is a young archipelago with oldest soils dating back to Jurassic and archipelago forming during the Paleogene. Its faunal records of fossil bodies mostly are within the Cenozoic era with Pleistocene fauna began appearing in many islands attributable to modern geography. Paleontological and archeological findings yielded information regarding the extinct species found in the Philippines through the excavation of various sites in the country. The first scientifically described megafaunal fossil found was of a stegodon (Stegodon mindanensis). It was collected from a Manobo medicine man in Mindanao, which was used as a talisman. Recent Holocene extinctions, however, are on the rise, being associated with human derived activities. Deforestation is one of the primary cause and is the reason of numerous extinctions and extirpations in the island of Cebu.

Cenozoic extinctions 
The Philippines had a large and diverse group of mammalian species in the past. They are widely distributed across the archipelago, but they became extinct due to several factors. At least eleven mammalian genera and a reptile have been extinct since the Pleistocene Epoch. A fossil species of the Sirenia has been found on Palawan and possibly went extinct during the Miocene. Most of the described fossils are only known from their incomplete remains known from the Pleistocene. Many among the fossils collected were collected even without stratigraphic data. This makes the identity of many specimens vague, and presents problems in many aspects. Confirming the question of the validity of only having one large stegodon species is one. There are also problems about having many of the early specimens being lost. This, in turn, made the categorization of some fossils to be uncertain. The fossil of the supposed cf. Antilope found in 1910, was suggested by Koenigswald in 1956, to be a bovid fossil rather than an antelope. Nothing definite will be pronounced as the fossil was lost.

Holocene extinctions 
During the Holocene Epoch, assisted by the closing of the Palawan land bridge from the Late Pleistocene, the rising sea level, climate change, and human occupation; many among the Palawan fauna went extinct. Introduced animals, like the Asian elephant, became extinct for unknown reasons. 13th to 16th centuries. One former species of bat known as Acerodon lucifer was thought to be extinct, but is now synonymous with the giant golden-crowned flying fox. Thus, the species still thrives in the archipelago, but is locally extinct on the island of Panay. There were also more recent extinctions (postcolonial era) caused by overhunting and habitat fragmentation; examples of this are several Cebu fauna like the Cebu warty pig and several barb species found in the Lake Lanao.

Other possibly extinct animals 
There are also animals that are considered to be extinct but has unconfirmed sightings, reported sightings or supposed rediscoveries. Some populations may also just be data deficient but are predicted to be extinct. These populations, however, are almost always certainly considered as Critically endangered if not extinct.

See also
 List of mammals of the Philippines
 List of Asian animals extinct in the Holocene

References

†
†
'Philippines
Philippines
Philippines
'
'